Delagua is a ghost town in Las Animas County, Colorado, United States. The town site is about 5 miles (8 km) south of Aguilar. It served as a company-owned coal-mining town for the Victor-American Fuel Company.

Delagua is a name derived from Spanish meaning "of the water" (and it refers to the 'canon of the water'). Delagua was incorporated as a town in 1903, and its post office opened the same year. The Colorado and Southeastern Railway was extended to serve the mine and town.

Delagua Mine 

Delagua developed around the Delagua bituminous coal mine, opened in 1903 and operated by the Victor American Fuel Company. It was located in Canon Del Agua, situated approximately three miles west of the Hastings Mine, the site of a mine explosion in 1917,  and 8 miles west of the site of the Ludlow Massacre, which occurred in 1914. As of 1922, it was the largest mine in Colorado, and at its peak employed at least 900 men.

Delagua Social Club 
In October 1917, the Delagua Mine was considered one of the "largest and finest 'mining camps' in the state". By 1916 the saloon and dance hall had been converted into the Delagua Social Club, complete with "three first class pool tables and one billiard table", a soda fountain, bowling alleys, a stage that featured a motion picture show twice weekly and at least 250 members in 1917.

Mine explosion 
 
At the Delagua Mine on November 8, 1910, an explosion (loud enough to be heard three miles away in Hastings) killed 76 miners. Safety inspectors later determined that the blast was an explosion of gas and dust, caused by the open flame of a head lamp.  One month earlier, a similar explosion at the Starkville Mine claimed 57, which combined with the lives lost in the Delagua disaster resulted in 136 deaths in Las Animas County in just one month.

A smaller disaster on May 27, 1927, killed six.

Delagua was also the site of armed conflict between strikers and strike-breakers during the Colorado Coalfield War in 1914. A Colorado House of Representatives subcommittee heard testimony that strikebreaking workers were lured to the Delagua mine under false pretenses and held there by force.

The mine was abandoned in 1969.

References 

Ghost towns in Colorado
Company towns in Colorado
Former populated places in Las Animas County, Colorado